Lianglukou is an interchange station between Line 1 and Line 3 of Chongqing Rail Transit in Chongqing Municipality, China, which opened in 2011. It is located in Yuzhong District.

It is the closest metro station to Chongqing railway station and therefore is often used as an interchange with that, accessed by using the Huangguan Escalator.

Station structure

Gallery

References

Yuzhong District
Railway stations in China opened in 2011
Chongqing Rail Transit stations
Railway stations in Chongqing